During the 2010–11 season in Indonesian football, the national team played a number of friendlies and embarked on the qualifying rounds for the 2014 World Cup, defeating Turkmenistan in the second round in July 2011. National youth teams also played in several international championships.

The top-tier national league, the Indonesia Super League, was won by Persipura Jayapura, and Persela U-21 won the under-21 competition. The Premier Division champions were Persiba Bantul.

National leagues

Indonesian Super League

Premier Division

National teams

Senior team
This section covers Indonesia's senior team matches from October 2010 until the end of the 2014 FIFA World Cup qualification - AFC First round.

Friendly matches

U-17
These results and fixtures included AFC and AFF competition, when AFC U-16 Championship, serves as a qualification tournament for the FIFA U-17 World Cup, and AFF U-16 Youth Championship tournament’s eligibility criteria that was played at under-16 level, while FIFA competition, named FIFA U-17 World Cup, founded as the FIFA U-16 World Championship, is the world championship of association football for male players under the age of 17. So, Indonesia U-17 team serves as Indonesia U-16 team on AFC U-16 Championship and AFF U-16 Youth Championship.

2010 AFF U-16 Youth Championship 

Player may not over the age of 16 years.

2010 AFC U-16 Championship 

Player may not over the age of 16 years.

References

External links
 PSSI
 ASEAN Football Federation

 
Indonesian
Indonesian